Pavlukhin is a Russian masculine surname, its feminine counterpart is Pavlukhina. Notable people with the surname include:

Olena Pavlukhina (born 1989), Ukrainian-born road cyclist

Russian-language surnames